The Harley-Davidson RL 45 is a model of the R-series range produced from 1932 to 1936, preceded by the DL range (1929-1931), which was Harley-Davidson's first 45 cubic-inch and first flathead V-twin motorcycle, and succeeded in 1937 by the WL. The R-series range included 45-solo, R, RL and RLD models. The RL, like the DL before it, featured a total-loss oiling system; the following WL had a recirculating oil system.

Overview 

Despite being launched in the middle of the Great Depression, when Harley-Davidson's sales were at a twenty-year low, the RL continued in production, helping Harley-Davidson to become one of only two American motorcycle manufacturers to survive the Depression. Influenced by the way in which the automobile industry had used Art Deco stylings, Harley featured a stylized Art Deco style image on the motorcycle's fuel tank.

Harley offered a competition-bred RLDR 45, and also produced a three-wheel Servi-Car (or 'Service-Car') model.

Prior to the Second World War, Harley's RL Sports model and Servi-Car were produced in Japan under license to the company Rikuo (Rikuo Internal Combustion Company)

Production continued until 1958.

A red 1934 RL45 was owned by Hollywood star Clark Gable.

See also 

 List of Harley-Davidson motorcycles

References

RL 45
Motorcycles introduced in the 1930s